"Heart of Gold" is a song by English band Johnny Hates Jazz, released by Virgin in 1988 as the fourth single from their debut studio album Turn Back the Clock (1987). The song was written by Clark Datchler and produced by Calvin Hayes and Mike Nocito. It reached number 19 in the UK Singles Chart and remained in the top 100 for seven weeks.

Background
Lead vocalist and writer Clark Datchler was inspired to write "Heart of Gold" after talking to a prostitute he met in Los Angeles. He told Sunday World in 1988, 

Musically, the song was partly inspired by Rick James' "Mr. Policeman", a song from his 1981 album Street Songs. Recalling "Heart of Gold" in 2021, Datchler told Will Harris, "It was a semi-reggae track, big horn section. It turned out to be a good track." He added that it was a "really good recording" and one which provides a "good illustration of my [musical] influences as a kid".

Music video
The song's music video was directed by David Fincher.

Critical reception
Upon its release, Max Bell of Number One gave "Heart of Gold" a three out of five star rating and commented, "Ostensibly a song about a lady of the night, it drifts into the subconscious before you can say 'hang on, I don't usually fall for innocuous songs like this'. Still, it's stylish, if eminently forgettable." Eleanor Levy of Record Mirror described it as a "slightly more up-tempo number [that] never quite manages to break out of its cosy, lolloping trot". She added, "Yet the Johnnies do write exceedingly good tunes and their slickness is expertly, even lovingly, crafted."

John Lee of the Huddersfield Daily Examiner praised the song as "punchy and crisp" and felt that the "tale of a prostitute set to a bouncy back track is bound to give the[m] another hit". Music & Media noted it "luckily [has] a bit more bite and spice" than the "drooling" "Turn Back the Clock". They added, "A sometimes very Level 42-like drive is coupled with some effective brass and a joyful chorus."

Track listing
7–inch single (UK, Europe and Australasia)
"Heart of Gold" – 3:28
"Leave It Up to Me" – 3:22

7–inch limited edition, numbered box set (UK)
"Heart of Gold" – 3:28
"Leave It Up to Me" – 3:22

12–inch single (UK, Europe and Australasia)
"Heart of Gold" (Extended Version) – 6:41
"Leave It Up to Me" – 3:22
"Heart of Gold" – 3:28

CD and cassette limited edition single (UK)
"Heart of Gold" – 3:28
"Leave It Up to Me" – 3:22
"Heart of Gold" (Extended Mix) – 6:41
"The Cage" – 3:59

Personnel
Credits are adapted from the Turn Back the Clock vinyl LP liner notes and the UK 12-single vinyl single.

Johnny Hates Jazz
 Clark Datchler
 Mike Nocito
 Calvin Hayes

Additional musicians
 Stevie Lang – backing vocals
 Miriam Stockley – backing vocals

Production
 Calvin Hayes – producer
 Mike Nocito – producer
 Will Gosling – remix engineer ("Heart of Gold")

Other
 Nicole Redican – sleeve design
 Simon Fowler – photography (front sleeve)
 Sheila Rock – photography (back sleeve)
 Andrea – model

Charts

References

1987 songs
1988 singles
Virgin Records singles
Johnny Hates Jazz songs
Songs written by Clark Datchler
Songs about prostitutes